Chathuranga Silva (born 2 October 1993) is a Sri Lankan cricketer. He made his first-class debut for Sri Lanka Army Sports Club in the 2019–20 Premier League Tournament on 10 August 2020.

References

External links
 

1993 births
Living people
Sri Lankan cricketers
Sri Lanka Army Sports Club cricketers
Place of birth missing (living people)